Heinrich Retschury (5 January 1887 – 11 June 1944) was an Austrian football player, referee, coach and official. He played for First Vienna FC and the Austrian team as defender.

Career
Heinrich Retschury played for First Vienna FC as defender. Together with Wilhelm Eipeldauer he formed the defence of the club. He also played in the Austria national football team. His first match was a 4:0 win against Transleithanien. Transleithanien was the Hungarian part of the Austrian-Hungary Empire. He played another 5 times in the team. His last appearance for Austria was a 1:8 versus England on 1 June 1909. Later he was a member of the Olympic squad for the Stockholm Olympic games in 1912, but he did not play there.

Coach
During the First World War he was caretaker of the football national team because the coach Hugo Meisl became a soldier. (23 matches: 6 won, 4 draws, 13 lost). Also in the year 1937, after the death of Hugo Meisl, he became caretaker of the national team (5 matches: 2 won, 1 draw, 2 lost) and reached the qualification for the 1938 FIFA World Cup where Austria did not play, because the country was occupied by Germany.

Referee
After his football career he became a successful international referee. At the 1924 Olympic Games in Paris, he refereed three matches (round of 16: Belgium-Sweden 1:8; Quarterfinal: Netherlands-Irish Free State 2:1; First Bronze medal: Netherlands-Sweden 1:1;). He also refereed league and cup matches in Austria.

References

Austrian footballers
Austrian football managers
Austria national football team managers
1887 births
1944 deaths
Footballers from Vienna
First Vienna FC players
Association football defenders